Rosegg is a town in the district of Villach-Land in Carinthia in Austria.

Neighboring municipalities

Personalities
It is the birthplace of the painter Peter Markovič, after whom the local Slovene cultural association is named. Liechtenstein's Ambassador to Germany, Prince Stefan of Liechtenstein, grew up in Rosegg.

Twin towns
 Zuglio, Italia

Sources 

Cities and towns in Villach-Land District